San Francisco de Alfarcito is a rural municipality and village in Jujuy Province in Argentina.

References

External links

Populated places in Jujuy Province